Erlend Øvereng Bjøntegaard (born 30 July 1990) is a Norwegian biathlete. He has competed in the Biathlon World Cup, and represented Norway at the Biathlon World Championships 2016. Bjøntegaard represents the club IL Bevern in a remote part of Kongsberg.

Biathlon results
All results are sourced from the International Biathlon Union.

Olympic Games
0 medals

*The mixed relay was added as an event in 2014.

World Championships
0 medals

*During Olympic seasons competitions are only held for those events not included in the Olympic program.
**The single mixed relay was added as an event in 2019.

References

External links
 
 
 
 
 

1990 births
Living people
People from Kongsberg
Norwegian male biathletes
Biathletes at the 2018 Winter Olympics
Olympic biathletes of Norway
Sportspeople from Viken (county)